Peter Louis Franceschi (September 28, 1919 – July 22, 1989) was an American football running back and defensive back who played one season for the San Francisco 49ers in 1946. He also played for the San Francisco Clippers in 1947.

In his career he had 8 rush attempts for −5 yards and a touchdown. He also had 3 receptions for 35 yards and a touchdown. With the Clippers in 1947 he scored five touchdowns.

References

1919 births
1989 deaths
San Francisco 49ers players
American football running backs
Players of American football from San Francisco